Irina Yevdokimova (born 14 August 1978) is a Kazakhstani gymnast. She competed at the 2000 Summer Olympics.

Eponymous skill
Yevdokimova has one eponymous skill in the Code of Points.

References

External links
 

1978 births
Living people
Kazakhstani female artistic gymnasts
Olympic gymnasts of Kazakhstan
Gymnasts at the 2000 Summer Olympics
Sportspeople from Almaty
Asian Games medalists in gymnastics
Gymnasts at the 1994 Asian Games
Gymnasts at the 1998 Asian Games
Asian Games silver medalists for Kazakhstan
Asian Games bronze medalists for Kazakhstan
Medalists at the 1994 Asian Games
Medalists at the 1998 Asian Games
Originators of elements in artistic gymnastics
20th-century Kazakhstani women